Hildá Birget Länsman, also known by her Saami name as Ánn-Ovllá Káre Jari Hildá (born 1993) is a Sámi singer, yoiker, and musician from Finland. In addition to performing with her own bands Duo Vildá and Gájanas, she also frequently performing with her mother Ulla Pirttijärvi, both with their band Solju and on some of her mother's albums. Länsman also often appears as a guest artist on songs by other musicians and bands.

Biography
Born in Ohcejohka, the northernmost municipality in Finland, Hildá Länsman is the daughter of Ulla Pirttijärvi, a yoiker and singer, and Jari Länsman, a reindeer herder. She took to traditional culture at an early age, creating a yoik for the moon when she was just three. She later perfected her interest in music, studying for over two years at Helsinki's Sibelius Academy.

When she was eight, Länsman made her first recording, singing a yoik on the Máttaráhku askái album released by her mother in 2002. In 2011, together with Niillas Holmberg, she performed on Inger-Mari Aikio-Arianaick's IMA hutkosat CD. She and Holmberg went on to sing children's songs on a number of videos. She also yoiked on the Gudnejahtatgo track with Ailu Valle on his Dušši dušše duššat album in 2012. In 2014, together with her mother, she formed the duo Solju, which means brooch.

In 2014, they formed the duo Solju, placed third with "Hold Your Colours" in the pre-Eurovision Finnish contest UMK in 2015. In January 2019, Solju received the Folk Music Creator prize at the Finnish Ethnogala. Solju also won the prize for the Best International Indigenous Release at the Canadian Indigenous Music Awards (2019). The duo's début album Ođđa Áigodat (New Times) was released in April 2018.

Released in April 2018, the album Ođđa Áigodat (New Times) features Länsman and her mother. The tracks, all in the Northern Sami language, are inspired by both traditional yoiking and contemporary pop. They include "Heargevuoddji" (Reindeer Driver), "Irgeávnnas" (Boyfriend-to-Be) and the beautifully sad title number "Ođđa Áigodat" (New Times).

Released in April 2019 the album Vildaluodda - Wildprint. VILDÁ (Hildá Länsman & Viivi Maria Saarenkylä) is a blend of indigenous Sámi yoiks, grooving accordion rhythms and improvisation. VILDÁ's debut album Vildaluodda - Wildprint (2019 Bafe's Factory) is a journey to Sámi lands - the vast landscapes, arctic hills and frosty winds.

Awards
In 2017 Hildá Länsman won the Intersection Prize awarded by the Global Music Centre at the Finnish Ethnogala. In 2018, Ulla Pirttijärvi and Hildá Länsman won the genre-free Vuoden etnotekijä prize awarded by the Finnish Music Publishers Association. In January 2019, Solju received the Folk Music Creator prize at the Finnish Ethnogala. Solju also won the prize for the Best International Indigenous Release at the Canadian Indigenous Music Awards (2019).

Discography

Studio albums
 2011 – Ima hutkosat, with Niillas Holmberg et al.
 2018 – Ođđa Áigodat, with Solju
 2019 – Vildaluodda, with VILDÁ
 2020 – Ođđa Áigodat (Remixed),  with Solju
 2021 – Čihkkojuvvon, with Gájanas

Compilation albums
 2021 – Sámi Grand Prix 2021, together with Lávre with the song Jođi

Singles
 2018 – Hildá: Muittut
 2018 – Heargevuoddji,  with Solju
 2019 – Utsjoki-disko, juávhoin VILDÁ
 2020 – Remember your name, Pt. 1, with VILDÁ
 2020 – Remember your name, Pt. 2, with VILDÁ
 2020 – Diamántadulvvit, with Gájanas

Other appearances 
 2002 – Ulla Pirttijärvi: De juoiggas 
 2002 – Ulla Pirttijärvi: Gádja Nillá
 2012 – Ailu Valle: Gudnejahtatgo?
 2018 – Anna Murtola: La llama
 2018 – Aurora Hentunen: Tunturi
 2018 – Don Johnson Big Band: The Sun
 2018 – Mikko Heikinpoika: Polar Night
 2018 – Tero Hetero: Tahdon
 2020 – Elin & The Woods: Dearvvuođat Sámis
 2020 – Elin & The Woods: I'm Nature
 2020 – Ensamble Transatlántico de Folk Chileno: Eymün weke che, with VILDÁ

References

External links
 Gájanas
 Solju
 VILDÁ

1993 births
Living people
People from Utsjoki
Finnish Sámi musicians
21st-century Finnish women singers